A graduate students association, or graduate student union, or variations, is an organization organized by and for students at university who are past the undergraduate stage.

Some have organized graduate student unions.

Notable GSAs are:

Australia
University of Melbourne student organisations

Canada
List of Ontario students' associations
Graduate Students' Association (University of Ottawa)

United States
Associated Students of the University of California, Santa Barbara
University of California Student Association
Graduate Students of UC Irvine Undergraduate Students Association Council (Los Angeles)
 Associated Students of UC Merced Graduate Student Association
National Black Graduate Student Association
University of Maryland, Baltimore County student organizations
Temple University Graduate Students Association

References

graduate student associations